The Connectivity Standards Alliance (CSA), formerly the Zigbee Alliance, is a group of companies that maintain and publish the Zigbee standard and the soon to be Matter standard. The name Zigbee is a registered trademark of this group, and is not a single technical standard. The organization publishes application profiles that allow multiple OEM vendors to create interoperable products. The relationship between IEEE 802.15.4 and Zigbee is similar to that between IEEE 802.11 and the Wi-Fi Alliance.

Over the years, the Alliance's membership has grown to over 500 companies, including the likes of Comcast, Ikea, Legrand, Samsung SmartThings, and Amazon. The Zigbee Alliance has three levels of membership: adopter, participant, and promoter. The adopter members are allowed access to completed Zigbee specifications and standards, and the participant members have voting rights, play a role in Zigbee development, and have early access to specifications and standards for product development.

The requirements for membership in the Zigbee Alliance cause problems for free-software developers because the annual fee conflicts with the GNU General Public Licence. The requirements for developers to join the Zigbee Alliance also conflict with most other free-software licenses. The Zigbee Alliance board of directors has been asked to make their license compatible with GPL, but refused. Bluetooth has GPL-licensed implementations.

As of May 11, 2021, the Zigbee Alliance has been rebranded to Connectivity Standards Alliance.

References

External links 
 

Standards organizations in the United States
Organizations established in 2002
Organizations based in California